The 2002 United States Senate election in Kentucky was held on November 5, 2002. Incumbent Republican U.S. Senator Mitch McConnell won re-election to a fourth term. This election was McConnell's biggest margin of victory to date. It is the only election in which he won Franklin County, and the most recent in which he won urban Jefferson and Fayette counties. The latter two were the only Kentucky counties won by either Hillary Clinton in 2016 or Joe Biden in 2020, signifying their leftward drift.

Democratic primary

Candidates 
 Lois Combs Weinberg, Vice Chair of the Council on Postsecondary Education in Kentucky
 Tom Barlow, former U.S. Representative

Results

Republican primary

Candidates 
 Mitch McConnell, incumbent U.S. Senator

Results 
McConnell was unopposed.

General election

Candidates 
 Mitch McConnell (R), incumbent U.S. Senator
 Lois Combs Weinberg (D), Vice Chair of the Council on Postsecondary Education in Kentucky

Predictions

Polling

Results

See also 
 2002 United States Senate election

Notes

References 

2002 Kentucky elections
Kentucky
2002